Furios may refer to:

 Iván Furios (born 1979), an Argentinian footballer
 Los Furios, a Canadian band

See also
 
 Furio (disambiguation)
 Furiosa (disambiguation)
 Furioso (disambiguation)
 Furious (disambiguation)